The Latin Grammy Award for Best Short Form Music Video is an honor presented annually at the Latin Grammy Awards, a ceremony that recognizes excellence and creates a wider awareness of cultural diversity and contributions of Latin recording artists in the United States and internationally. The award has been given since the 1st Latin Grammy Awards in 2000 to artists, directors and producers of an individual promotional music video released for the first time during the award eligibility year.

"No Me Dejes de Querer", performed by Gloria Estefan and directed by Emilio Estefan, was the first music video to be win the award. They were followed by Ricky Martin for the video "She Bangs". Shakira's "Suerte" was also awarded, and the recipient of the first Video of the Year award at the MTV Video Music Awards Latinoamérica. The English-language version of the video received four nominations at the MTV Video Music Awards of 2002. The music video for the bilingual track "Frijolero" by Mexican band Molotov, that employs animation software previously developed by the directors Jason Archer and Paul Beck for the American film Waking Life, received the award in 2003.

Puerto-Rican band Calle 13 holds the record for the most wins as an ensemble in this category with four (out of seven nominations), "Atrévete-te-te", "La Perla", "Calma Pueblo" and "Ojos Color Sol"; by virtue of his lead performance with Calle 13 and two additional victories as a solo artist, Residente is the category biggest winner with six accolades. Colombian singer-songwriter Juanes has been awarded three times for the music videos for "Volverte a Ver", "Me Enamora", and "Pa'Dentro". Gabriel Coss and Carlos R. Pérez hold the record for the most wins as directors, with a total of two each. Guatemalan singer Ricardo Arjona and Argentinean band Babasónicos hold the record for the most nominations without a win, with three each.

Winners and nominees

2000s

2010s

2020s

 Each year is linked to the article about the Latin Grammy Awards held that year.

See also
 Grammy Award for Best Short Form Music Video
 Lo Nuestro Award for Video of the Year
 Los Premios MTV Latinoamérica for Video of the Year

References

General
  Note: User must select the "Music Video" category as the genre under the search feature.

Specific

External links
Official site of the Latin Grammy Awards

 
Short Form Music Video